Victoria Jubilee Government High School (V.J. Government High School for short) is the oldest high school in Chuadanga district and one of the oldest schools in Bangladesh. The school was established at Chuadanga Sadar in 1880. Victoria Jubilee Government High School has a unique contribution and identity since pre-independence times. During the war of liberation the training of freedom fighters was given in the school. The school is located on the banks of river Mathabhanga in Chuadanga district. The school is divided into two shifts, morning and day. The school offers classes from third to tenth.

Although it is a boys' school only, it has both male and female teachers. The school has a head teacher and separate assistant head teachers and teachers for day and morning branches.

History 
The school was established in 1880 with the efforts of the late Abul Hossain Joarddar, a local zamindar. At the time of establishment, this school was named S. E. School Later this school was promoted to H.E. School. He donated seven acres of land. He is the founding headmaster of the school. There is a common saying in this regard: - "Abul Hossain Joarddar built a school in Chuadanga town from house to house to light the light of knowledge".  Mr. Manmathanath Gui became the headmaster of the school and played an important role in the development of the school. The school was named Victoria Jubilee High School on the occasion of the Silver Jubilee of the reign of the then Queen Victoria of England on 16 February 1887.

Initially, the school started in a tin house, but in 1928, a tin house was replaced by a pucca building. The school was made official on February 1, 1980. Since then, the name of the school has been associated with Government, meaning V.J. Government High School (full: Victoria Jubilee Government High School). The active participation of the students of this school in the language movement of 1952 and the war of independence of 1971 has further enriched the history of Chuadanga district. The school has been recognized as the best school by the people of the district by achieving good results in all types of examinations by the Board of Education. The number of students is increasing. Therefore, the school was transformed into a double shift in 2011 to maintain the quality of education and provide opportunities for more students to study.  Since the establishment of the school, the abbreviated form of the name of the school became popular and was used in all cases. However, on March 30, 2022, in a letter signed by the Director General of DSHE, Nehal Ahmed, in a brief signed by the Directorate of Secondary and Higher Education, Ministry of Education, Bangladesh, the headmaster of the school, Md. Bilal Hossain Completed the work of writing full name and founding time.

Infrastructure 
Victoria Jubilee Government High School has two grounds, one inside the school and the other outside the school. The school has a four-storey, three-storey, five-storey building with two dormitories and several one-storey buildings. The school also has an auditorium with a bicycle garage, a motorcycle garage, a two-storey mosque, a clean water plant and a permanent stage. In addition to a computer lab, there are two permanent multimedia classrooms and four separate labs for teaching physics, chemistry, biology and agriculture. There is a library here. The library of this school is quite rich and large as it is a very old school. Many old books are preserved in the library of this school. There are 10,000 different types of books including textbooks, stories, novels, plays, jokes, history books, essays, science based books and religious books. There is also a Shaheed Minar on one side of the school grounds.

Admission 
In the school mainly students get the opportunity to get admission in third and sixth class. Eligible students are selected through highly competitive admission test. Thousands of students participated in the admission test. In the third class, 60 students get admission in each branch. A total of 240 people can be admitted, including 120 in the morning shift and 120 in the day shift. In addition, a total of 24 students can be admitted in the sixth class, including 12 in the morning shift and 12 in the day shift. The admission process ends in December.

Uniform 
There is a specific uniform system for school students. Wearing navy blue pants, white shorts, white sneakers, black tights and an ID card with one's own name is mandatory for students. In order to distinguish the students of the two shifts, the color of the shirts of the students in the morning shift is plain white but the white shirts of the students of the day shift have a navy blue color collar and navy blue border on the pockets. Winter blue sweaters are also included in the uniform for both shifts and the shirt has a badge with the school monogram.

School assembly 
School assembly is a part of school activities. The school activities started through the assembly. At present the school has two shifts. The morning shift assembly starts at 7:15 and ends at 7:30. The day shift assembly starts at 12:15 and ends at 12:30. Activities like recitation of the Quran, hoisting of the national flag with due dignity, singing of the national anthem, recitation of the oath etc., occur. During the assembly, students are lined up at the school meeting place according to class and section. All the teachers are present at the meeting place and assist the students if necessary. Pity and parades are arranged for the students during the assembly for physical and mental well-being. From time to time the results of various types of competitions are announced and prizes are given to the students. Occasionally the head teacher or the teacher in charge gives the students policy and advice. The entire assembly program is conducted by a physical education teacher or experienced teacher.

Class activities 
School activities are divided into two shifts, morning and day. Class activities are completed in both shifts by dividing the school into   Six Periods. Morning shift class activities start at 7:30 am and end at 12 pm. The day shift 
class activities start at 12:30 pm and end at 4.50 pm. However, this period is only for sixth to tenth class, third to fifth class activities are a bit less. Both shifts have a break of 30 minutes after the third period. During this time students are given tiffins. Everyday homework at school has to be written in the diary provided by the school.

Co-curriculum activities 
 BNCC (Bangladesh National Cadet Corps)
 Scouting
 Red Crescent Society
 Sports
 Plantation
 Debate
 Annual Magazine
 Science Fair
 Parent assembly
 New Book Distribution Ceremony
 Award ceremonies and cultural events
 Reception of new students
 Farewell Ceremony of SSC Students
 Annual Milad and prayer ceremonies on the occasion of Eid-e-Miladunnabi

Annual magazine 
Pictures of students of each branch of the school, pictures of teachers, pictures of office staff, pictures of various events and activities, various poems, plays, jokes, essays, stories, riddles, pictures, pictures from eminent people, Annual magazines or periodicals are made up of various important information including the results of public examinations of the year.

Former students 
 Solaiman Haque Joarder, MP, Bangladesh

References 

High schools in Bangladesh
Schools in Chuadanga District
1880 establishments in British India
Educational institutions established in 1880
Boys' schools in Bangladesh